Kevin Liles (born February 27, 1968) is an  American record executive and co-founder and CEO of 300 Entertainment. In 2020, Kevin was recognized by Billboard Magazine as R&B/Hip-Hop Executive of the Year for both his efforts in activism and the continued success of Megan Thee Stallion.

Early life and education
Liles grew up near Baltimore, Maryland, and graduated from Woodlawn High School. He was raised by his mother, Alberta Fennoy, an accountant, and stepfather Jerome Fennoy, a railway conductor, along with three siblings. He attended Morgan State University, studying engineering on an electrical engineering scholarship from NASA, but left the program prior to graduating to pursue a musical career.

Career
Liles began his music career as a member of the Baltimore-based DJ crew, Numarx. In 1986, the group co-wrote "Girl You Know It's True," which was first recorded by Numarx but later became a massive first hit for Milli Vanilli.

Liles was president of Def Jam Recordings and executive vice president of The Island Def Jam Music Group from 1999 to 2004. He served as executive vice president for Warner Music Group, working under his former Island Def Jam associate Lyor Cohen  before stepping down as executive vice president of Warner Music Group to pursue entrepreneurial endeavors in September 2009.

In 2009, Liles launched New York City-based KWL Enterprises. In 2012, he co-founded 300 Entertainment with Lyor Cohen, Roger Gold and Todd Moscowitz.

Philanthropy
Liles' philanthropic activity has included serving as co-chair for the New Yorkers For Children Gala and his creation and ongoing participation in the Kevin Liles for a Better Baltimore Foundation.

Personal life
Liles is married to Erika Liles. He and Erika have two daughters together.

References

External links
Kevin Liles' official site
April 4, 2012 Kevin Liles launched his 1 million free career assessment challenge

1968 births
Living people
Record producers from Maryland
Businesspeople from Baltimore
African-American record producers
21st-century African-American people
20th-century African-American people